The Cotton Exchange, Karachi is located in Karachi, Sindh, Pakistan. It is the largest cotton trading exchange in Pakistan.

Founded in 1933, it is the oldest commodity exchange in Pakistan.

See also 
 Karachi Stock Exchange
List of South Asian stock exchanges

References

External links
 Karachi Cotton Exchange
 Trading in Karachi Cotton Exchange
 The Karachi Cotton Association - Official site

Commodity exchanges in Pakistan
Agricultural organisations based in Pakistan
Cotton organizations
Economy of Karachi
Textile industry of Pakistan
1933 establishments in British India
Organisations based in Karachi